Sara María Uribe Sánchez (born 1978 Querétaro) is a Mexican poet. Her poems have appeared in periodicals and anthologies in Mexico, Peru, Spain, Canada, the United Kingdom and the United States.

Life 

Born in 1978 in Querétaro, Mexico, Uribe has lived in Tamaulipas since 1996. She graduated with an undergraduate degree in philosophy.

Awards 
 2004 Carmen Alardín Regional Poetry Prize in 2004
 2005 Tijuana National Poetry Prize 
 2005 Clemente López Trujillo Poetry Prize  
 2006-2007 Fondo Nacional para la Cultura y las Artes 
 2010 & 2013 Programa de Estímulos a la Creación y Desarrollo Artístico

Works 
 Lo que no imaginas  Fondo Regional para la Cultura y las Artes del Noreste, 2005. , 
 Palabras más palabras menos Tijuana, Baja California : Instituto Municipal de Arte y Cultura, 2006. 
 Nunca quise detener el tiempo Ciudad Victoria, Tamaulipas [Mexico] : Gobierno del Estado de Tamaulipas, Instituto Tamaulipeco para la Cultura y las Artes, 2007. 
 Goliat (2009) 
 Siam  Consejo Nacional para la Cultura y las Artes, Dirección General de Publicaciones, 2012. , 
 Antigona Gonzalez Oaxaca de Juárez, Oaxaca : SurPlus Ediciones, 2012. , 
Works in English
 Antigona Gonzalez, John Pluecker translator, Les Figues Press, 2016,

References 

Living people
21st-century Mexican poets
1978 births
Writers from Querétaro
21st-century Mexican women writers